Chester Williams (1970–2019) was a South African rugby union rugby player. 

Chester Williams may also refer to:
Chester Williams (baseball) (1906–1952), American Negro league baseball player
Chester Williams (police officer) (born 1973), Commissioner of Belize
Chester Sidney Williams (1907–1992), American educator and author